was a seaplane tender in the Imperial Japanese Navy (IJN).

History
The ship was built at Kawasaki's Kōbe Shipyard and launched on 13 December 1936 as a merchant vessel for the Kawasaki Kisen K. K. Line.  Kyokawa Maru was involved in a collision with the small train ferry Uko Maru No. 1 on 19 August 1937 in the Seto Inland Sea, southwest of Nakanose.

Requisitioned by the IJN on 28 September 1941 and was refitted as a seaplane tender. The ship subsequently saw service in the Pacific Campaign of World War II.  Kiyokawa Maru was attacked by aircraft from Task Force 38 on 20 July 1945. Hit by bombs and heavily damaged she was beached off Shida beach north of Kaminoseki, Yamaguchi to avoid sinking.

On 22 November 1945 during heavy weather, Kiyokawa Maru sank. Raised in December 1948, later repaired and put in civilian passenger service. Scrapped 1969.

References
 
 
 

1937 ships
Kamikawa Maru-class seaplane tenders
Maritime incidents in July 1945
Maritime incidents in November 1945
Shipwrecks of Japan
Ships of the Kawasaki Kisen
Ships built by Kawasaki Heavy Industries